Jairo Morillas Rivero (born 2 July 1993) is a Spanish footballer who plays for CD Ebro as a striker.

Club career
Born in Gilena, Seville, Andalusia, Morillas graduated from Sevilla FC's youth setup, and made his debuts as a senior with the C-team in the 2009–10 campaign in Tercera División, aged only 16. He was promoted to the reserves in 2010, spending several seasons in Segunda División B.

On 3 July 2013 Morillas signed a two-year deal with RCD Espanyol, being assigned to the B-side also in the third level. He made his first-team – and La Liga – debut on 31 August of the following year, replacing Paco Montañés in the 79th minute of a 1–2 home loss against his former side Sevilla.

Morillas scored his first professional goal on 17 December, netting the game's winner in a home success against Deportivo Alavés, for the season's Copa del Rey. On 8 July 2015 he signed a new three-year deal with the Pericos, until 2018, and was loaned to Girona FC in Segunda División late in the month.

On 6 July 2016, Jairo was loaned to CD Numancia also in the second level, for one year. In April of the following year, he suffered an injury in the Achilles tendon, being sidelined for nearly a year.

On 15 July 2018, Morillas signed with J1 League side V-Varen Nagasaki as a free agent after leaving Espanyol.

References

External links

1993 births
Living people
People from Sierra Sur (Seville)
Sportspeople from the Province of Seville
Spanish footballers
Spanish expatriate footballers
Footballers from Andalusia
Association football forwards
La Liga players
Segunda División players
Segunda División B players
J1 League players
Sevilla FC C players
Sevilla Atlético players
RCD Espanyol B footballers
RCD Espanyol footballers
Girona FC players
CD Numancia players
V-Varen Nagasaki players
CD Badajoz players
CD Ebro players
Spain youth international footballers
Spanish expatriate sportspeople in Japan
Expatriate footballers in Japan